Juniperus monticola, or mountain juniper, is a species of conifer in the family Cupressaceae.
It is found only in Mexico.

References

monticola
Trees of Durango
Least concern plants
Endemic flora of Mexico
Taxonomy articles created by Polbot